High Council of State can refer to

 High Council of State (Algeria)
 High Council of State (Libya)
 High Council of State (Mauritania)
 High Council of State (Netherlands)